Muswell Hill is a suburban district of the London Borough of Haringey, north London.

Neighbouring areas include Highgate, Hampstead Garden Suburb, East Finchley and Crouch End. It has many streets with Edwardian architecture.

History 

The earliest records of Muswell Hill date from the 12th century. The Bishop of London, who was the Lord of the Manor of Haringey,  owned the area and granted , located to the east of Colney Hatch Lane, to a newly formed order of nuns. The nuns built a chapel on the site and called it Our Lady of Muswell.

The name Muswell is believed to come from a natural spring or well (the "Mossy Well"), said to have miraculous properties. A traditional story tells that Scottish king Malcolm IV was cured of disease after drinking the water.  The area became a place of pilgrimage for healing during medieval times.  The River Moselle, which has its source in Muswell Hill and Highgate, derives its name from this district; it was originally known as the Mosa or Mosella. Until the 1950s, the town's name was often pronounced "Muzzle Hill".

In the 18th century Muswell Hill was a scattered village consisting mainly of detached villas with large gardens.  In 1787 one commentator wrote that nowhere within  of London was there a village so pleasant or with such varied views.  Little had changed by the middle of the 19th century. One of the houses of the time was The Limes. This house occupied the angle of Muswell Hill Road with Colney Hatch Lane and was a three-storeyed house with portico and two-storeyed wing approached by a double carriage drive through impressive gateways. The large grounds of the house extended to Tetherdown and included a lake.  Opposite The Limes was Muswell Hill pond and beyond that the Green Man inn, built of stone.

A short distance down the north side of Muswell Hill was The Grove, which was three storeys high and had nine bays with pedimented projections at each end. In 1774 the house was occupied by Topham Beauclerk.

19th century
A little farther down the hill stood Grove Lodge, also in wooded grounds.  Altogether there were eight properties in Muswell Hill worthy of note in 1817.

Parallel with Muswell Hill was a track known as St James's Lane which ran across a triangle of wasteland. By the middle of the 19th century houses were already dispersed along the lane at the foot of which was Lalla Rookh, a two-storeyed villa with a wide verandah.  Other buildings there were apparently cottages or huts, both single and in terraces.

It was not until the end of the 19th century that Muswell Hill began to be developed more densely from a collection of country houses to the London village that it is today. The development was spurred by the opening in 1873 of Alexandra Palace, a massive pleasure pavilion built on the most easterly of north London's gravel hills and intended as the counterpart to the Crystal Palace on Sydenham Hill in south London. Alexandra Palace was served by a branchline railway from Highgate, with an intermediary station at Muswell Hill (see below). The foot of Alexandra Palace was served by another rail network with connecting services to Finsbury Park and Kings Cross stations.

20th century
Most development was initiated in the early 20th century when the current street pattern was set out and elegant Edwardian retail parades were constructed. The shopping centre is based on roads that form three sides of a square: Fortis Green Road, Muswell Hill Broadway and the extension of the Broadway into Colney Hatch Lane. At each node point is a church: United Reformed, Church of England, Methodist, and Roman Catholic. One of the nodes, opposite St James's CoE, was also the site of the Athenaeum music hall (later demolished with the site redeveloped as a supermarket), opposite which a surviving art deco Odeon cinema was built in the 1930s. The site of the Ritz, a cinema formerly at the top of Muswell Hill on the next node to the east, has been redeveloped as offices.

Until the mid-20th century there was a rail branch line, the Muswell Hill Railway, from Highgate which passed through Muswell Hill, terminating at a station at Alexandra Palace. It was intended under the Northern Heights plan to integrate this into the London Underground Northern line; some contemporary tube maps (e.g. the 1948 map) showed the line as being under construction.  However, this plan was cancelled after the Second World War, and the railway line was abandoned in 1954. The line was later converted to become the Parkland Walk.

In 1964, three young Muswell Hill residents, the brothers Ray and Dave Davies and Pete Quaiffe, formed The Kinks. Categorised in the United States as a British Invasion band, the Kinks are recognised as one of the most important and influential rock groups of the era. The Davies parents’ home at 6 Denmark Terrace, Fortis Green, remains a magnet for rock music tourists.

In 1979 Wetherspoons opened their very first pub, on Colney Hatch Lane.

In November 2016, the shop 'Really British' opened on Muswell Hill broadway. The shop owner was accused of racism, with local residents threatening to stage a protest, with more practising a boycott.

In March 2013 and June 2020 Muswell Hill was named one of the five most desirable places to live in London in the Sunday Times "Best Places To Live" guide.

Administration and representation
The hill was part of the Bishop of London's Manor of Hornsey, an area served from the medieval period by the ancient parish of Hornsey. Parishes were originally ecclesiastic in purpose, but from the Tudor era onwards had a civic as well as ecclesiastical purpose.

In 1903, the area of the civil parish of Hornsey became the Municipal Borough of Hornsey, within the  administrative county of Middlesex. Then in 1965 Horney merged with Tottenham and Wood Green to form the modern London Borough of Haringey.

Northern parts of the N10 postal area, sometimes also regarded as part of Muswell Hill, were part of the parish of Friern Barnet, which subsequently became Friern Barnet Urban District before becoming part of the London Borough of Barnet.

The area is in the Hornsey and Wood Green parliamentary constituency.

Geography
Close to Alexandra Park and Highgate Woods, Muswell Hill is a mainly Edwardian north London suburb. Muswell Hill Broadway and Fortis Green Road, the main shopping streets, still maintain their historic character with most of the original facades preserved above street level. The area has a synagogue and six churches, one of which has been converted into a steak house.

Education

Primary schools 
 Coppetts Wood Primary School and Children's Centre
 Coldfall Primary School
 Eden Primary
 Hollickwood JMI School
 Muswell Hill Primary School
 Norfolk House Preparatory
 Our Lady of Muswell RC Primary School
 Rhodes Avenue Primary School
 St James C of E Primary School
 Tetherdown Primary School

Secondary schools 

 Alexandra Park School
 Fortismere School

Special schools 

 Blanche Nevile School. A school for deaf and hearing impaired children, based on the sites of Highgate Primary School and Fortismere School.
 TreeHouse School, based at the Pears National Centre For Autism Education.

Transport

Rail 
Muswell Hill is not directly served by a tube or National Rail station.

Nearby tube stations include Bounds Green, East Finchley, Finsbury Park, Highgate, Turnpike Lane and Wood Green.

National Rail services pass to the east of Muswell Hill, calling at Alexandra Palace, Hornsey and Finsbury Park. Trains are operated by Great Northern and Thameslink to destinations such as Moorgate, Enfield and Welwyn Garden City. To the south of Muswell Hill, London Overground trains serve Crouch Hill station between Gospel Oak and Barking, via South Tottenham.

Bus 
Muswell Hill Broadway and Muswell Hill West are both served by London Buses, providing the area with a direct connection to the City of London and the West End. Buses also serve nearby stations.

Road 
The A504 passes east–west through Muswell Hill. Eastbound traffic is carried towards Hornsey, Wood Green and the A10. Westbound destinations include East Finchley, Hendon and the M1.

The A1201 terminates at Muswell Hill. Southbound destinations along this route include Crouch Hill, Finsbury Park and Highbury.

Highgate is to the south of the district and can be reached via Muswell Hill Road. To the north, Colney Hatch, Friern Barnet and Whetstone can be reached via Colney Hatch Lane. Both routes are numbered B550.

The A1 passes to the south of Muswell Hill, carrying traffic southbound towards Archway, Islington and the City of London. To the north, the route crosses the North Circular Road (A406), and traffic can reach destinations such as Mill Hill, Watford, Stevenage and Peterborough.

Cycling infrastructure in Muswell Hill is limited. The now-defunct London Cycle Network developed two signposted routes through Muswell Hill:

 Route 6 - an incomplete but signposted route from Barnet to Central London, passing through the Broadway on main roads.
 Route 54 - an unbroken but signposted route to Walthamstow via Tottenham following main roads. Between Highgate Wood and Alexandra Palace, the route skirts around the southeastern edge of Muswell Hill on a traffic-free shared-use path.

Campaigns 
The Muswell Hill Metro Group campaigns to reinstate a historic railway line which ran between Alexandra Palace and Finsbury Park, via Muswell Hill. The group says that the line would relieve congestion on local roads and that an electric railway would improve local air quality.

The Haringey Cycling Campaign is a local cycling lobby group.

Demography
The 2011 census showed that the N10 postal area (including parts of Friern Barnet} had a population of 27,992 in the 2011 census.

The same census showed that in the much smaller Muswell Hill electoral ward of the London Borough of Haringey, 84% of the population was white (65% British, 16% Other, 3% Irish). 40% were irreligious and Christian each, while the Jewish population stood at 5.3%.

Places of interest
 Alexandra Palace
 Alexandra Park
 Golf Course Allotments (the largest allotment site in the area)
 The Guy Chester Centre of the Methodist church
 Oliver Tambo Memorial Statue at the Albert Road Recreation Ground
 Muswell Hill United Synagogue

Cultural references
 

 In the war romance film The Americanization of Emily (1964), Emily's mother lives in a house in Dukes Avenue. Exterior shots show Alexandra Palace in the background.
 In the 1970s BBC TV comedy series Porridge, the principal character, Norman Stanley Fletcher, played by Ronnie Barker, hailed from Muswell Hill. Fletcher claimed that in his younger days he was "King of the Teds in Muswell Hill".
 The Kinks recorded the 1971 LP Muswell Hillbillies, which included the song "Muswell Hillbilly".
 The Yorkshire Television sitcom That's My Boy (1981–1986), starring Mollie Sugden and Christopher Blake, made frequent references to Muswell Hill, as the family lived in the area throughout the first four seasons.
 Series one of the 1993 sitcom Sean's Show is set in Muswell Hill.
 The Doctor Who episode "The Idiot's Lantern" (2006) is set in Muswell Hill, during Queen Elizabeth II's coronation in 1953.
 The Madness song "Driving in My Car" includes the line "I've been far, I drive up to Muswell Hill".
 Hilaire Belloc referenced Muswell Hill in the poem "Charles Augustus Fortescue".
 Angela Thirkell continues the tale of The Cedars, Muswell Hill in her 1939 novel, Before Lunch.
 Mentioned in Natasha Gordon's play Nine Night.
 Muswell Hill is a 2012 Torben Betts play which "hold[s] a mirror up to middle-class delusion".

People from Muswell Hill

See People from Muswell Hill and People from Fortis Green categories.

John Logie Baird was the first person to transmit moving pictures, now called television. The first public broadcasts were from nearby Alexandra Palace before WW2. His scanning, rotating disc system was later replaced by a more modern electronic system. The former John Baird pub, now the Village Green, in Fortis Green Road was named after him.

Musicians Ray and Dave Davies, founding members of The Kinks, grew up in Muswell Hill, the album title Muswell Hillbillies being an obvious reference to their youth. They allegedly played their first ever gig in the Clissold Arms in Fortis Green.

Musician Michael Kiwanuka was born and raised in Muswell Hill; he was the winner of the Mercury Prize 2020 for his album Kiwanuka and a nominee for the 2021 63rd Grammy Award for Best Rock Album. His album Love & Hate went to Number 1 on the UK albums chart in 2016.

Former KGB agent Alexander Litvinenko lived in Muswell Hill from his exile in 2000 until his assassination in 2006.

The group Fairport Convention started in the Muswell Hill family home of Simon Nicol. The house, Fairport, is on the south side of Fortis Green near the junction with Tetherdown and Fortis Green Road.

The serial killer and necrophile Dennis Nilsen committed his later murders in his Cranley Gardens flat in Muswell Hill and became known as the "Muswell Hill Murderer". 

A resident for a short time in Muswell Hill was the Russian-born England Rugby union star Prince Alexander Obolensky, who died in Suffolk in an aircraft accident in 1940 while training as an RAF pilot.

Philip Martell, musical director for Hammer House of Horrors lived in Woodland Gardens

Musician, author, poet, wit and great English eccentric Vivian Stanshall lived his final years in Muswell Hill, dying in a fire in his Hillfield Park flat in 1995.

Nearest places
 Colney Hatch
 Crouch End
 East Finchley 
 Friern Barnet
 Highgate
 Hornsey
 Wood Green

Nearest stations
 Alexandra Palace railway station
 Bowes Park railway station
 Hornsey railway station
 New Southgate station

The nearest tube stations are:
 Highgate
 Turnpike Lane 
 East Finchley
 Bounds Green
 Wood Green

See also

Hornsey (parish) for the local government unit of which Muswell Hill was part from medieval times to 1867
Municipal Borough of Hornsey for the local government unit of which Muswell Hill was part from 1903 to 1965

References and notes

External links
Muswell Hill & Fortis Green Association - has some good historical pictures etc.
History of Muswell Hill - Hornsey Historical Society - articles, books, postcards etc

 
Districts of the London Borough of Haringey
Areas of London
Places formerly in Middlesex
District centres of London